Early Doors is a BBC sitcom written by Craig Cash and Phil Mealey. Both writers appear in the series, playing the two characters of 'Joe' and 'Duffy' who are best friends. Early Doors is set at The Grapes, a small public house in the town of Stockport where daily life revolves around comical issues of love, loneliness and blocked urinals.

Scenario
The show is about a pub landlord named Ken , especially his preoccupation with his step-daughter Melanie, who is preparing to meet her real father and his nervous relationship with barmaid Tanya. Ken's wife left him for his best friend. The series reflects some of the Northern humour displayed in The Royle Family (co-written by Cash). In a similar style to The Royle Family, every scene unfolds at The Grapes and it is also set in Greater Manchester.  Two series of the show were produced in 2003 and 2004. The series refers to Stockport landmarks, including Houldsworth Square and the McVitie's factory.

Title
The title is a British slang phrase meaning those who arrive earlier than is customary and was often associated with pub customers who wait for or arrive soon after evening opening, around 5:30 p.m. Until the Licensing Act 1988, pubs in England closed in the afternoon. Most are now open all day. It is also widely heard in British football circles and was resuscitated in comments about football.  The phrase originates in the practice of British theatres from around 1870 of allowing customers who paid a little extra to enter the theatre early and choose their own seats to beat the rush just before the performance started.

Regular characters
 Ken Dixon (John Henshaw) - Landlord of The Grapes, and lives in the flat upstairs with mother Jean and stepdaughter Melanie. Ken is usually sarcastic and has been shown at times to be slightly crooked, once looking at the results for the football cards, taking forged money from his police friends and putting a very small amount of charity money into his till. Despite these attributes he is consistently shown to be kind-hearted and sensitive.
 Joe (Craig Cash) and Duffy (Phil Mealey), real name Nigel - "The Lads" of the pub. Best mates Joe and Duffy's friendship goes back to their childhood. Duffy has children and has been in trouble with his wife for sleeping with other women.
 Janice (Maxine Peake) (Series 1 only) - Janice is the single mother of a newborn baby, Calvin, who she brings into the pub in the first episode and asks Joe and Duffy to mind while she goes to Melanie's aerobics class upstairs.  It is suggested that Calvin is the result of a one night stand with Duffy in Ladbrokes doorway.  Joe often teases Duffy about this but Duffy says he took precautions - "I told her I'd had the snip".
 Eddie and Joan Bell (Mark Benton and Lorraine Cheshire) - A boring, simple minded but well-meaning couple. Eddie's conversations with Ken are usually one-sided and often revolve around temporary traffic lights nearby, a topic that interests him but no one else. Joan's mother is very old and owns several pets including six cats, a dog and a tortoise. Joan and Eddie are both quite intellectually challenged and they often make pointless conversation. They still seem to be madly in love after nineteen years of marriage.
 Tommy (Rodney Litchfield) - A miserable widower who seems to dislike the regulars and has no problem expressing his complaints (of which he has many). In series 2, he starts a new job which he tells the other regulars he hates because of the "buggers he works with".  As he finishes his drink and prepares to leave, it is revealed he is a lollipop man. In the same episode he is shown to be generous when it matters, when he refuses to take his winnings from the football card, instead putting it into a fund to pay off Eddie and Joan's phone bill when it is cut off due to Joan running up a bill through phoning her ill mother.
 Tanya (Susan Cookson) - Part-time barmaid and love interest of Ken. She is best friends with Debbie. She is good-hearted and down to earth and is known for being attractive, which is why it may be surprising that she clearly has feelings for Ken. Halfway through series 2 she informs Ken that she is leaving the pub but in the last episode he asks her to stay and she accepts his offer.
 Jean Dixon (Rita May) - Jean is Ken's mother and is often seen as imposing and manipulative. She seldom leaves her chair and is usually eating something sweet. She often complains about the greed and laziness of others, despite not being able to work her own kettle. Although she imposes on Ken's life and sometimes twists his words around to make people feel sorry for her, she really does care about her son. She shows disapproval about the mutual attraction that Ken and Tanya share, thinking Tanya isn't good enough for her son but quickly changes her opinion when she finds out Tanya lives in a large house with a conservatory. She often chats to Winnie. It is stated on the DVD commentary for series 1 that Jean is the first name of Craig Cash's mother.
 Winnie Cooper (Joan Kempson) - Cleaner of The Grapes and the upstairs flat, friends with Jean and well-liked by the regulars. She often makes comments that she knows will irritate Jean and shares all sorts of gossip with her. She has a son called Darren who has been in trouble several times with the law usually for theft. On the DVD commentary for series 1 it's stated that Winnie is the first name of Phil Mealey's mother.
 Melanie Dixon (Christine Bottomley) - Ken's stepdaughter and only child. Melanie is doted on by Ken who hopes she won't leave him for her real dad, Keith Braithwaite, who she searched for after learning Ken wasn't her real father. Melanie sees Ken as her real dad, although she does sometimes exploit his "soft" attitude towards her working hours and free drinks. Her biological father, Keith, starts a fight with Eddie at her 21st birthday. She has had two boyfriends in the series
 Liam (James McAvoy) - a student, Mel's boyfriend in Series 1. Liam is Scottish and is often seen smoking. Several jokes are made about the impressive size of his genitalia.
 Dean (Lee Ingleby) - Mel's boyfriend in Series 2. Dean seems to be liked by Ken and is a typical jack the lad type who gets on well with most if not all of the regulars. It is loosely implied on some occasions that Joan may have feelings for Dean.
 Debbie (Lisa Millett) - Pub regular and good friend to Tanya. She often leaves her kids in the car while she goes in for half a cider. She has cheated on her husband and has "gone with" Duffy rather than walk home. Debbie is possibly not the best mother, behaving neglectfully yet strictly towards her children. She seems to take a liking to Melanie's biological father Keith Braithwate (at least after a few drinks).
 Phil and Nige (James Quinn and Peter Wight) - Local crooked police officers whom Ken is friendly with. They often come knocking on the back door for a bitter and Diet Coke, to drink in The Grapes' kitchen, though they are partial to the odd cigar or brandy chaser. Phil and Nige often break the law, having stolen from an electrical store that was being robbed and are shown to be recreational drug users. In the second series they seem to lose any faith they had in their work after bungling a raid by falling asleep and are often smoking marijuana together. In the last episode, they seemed to have turned to drug dealing, while doing the odd bit of police work on the side. Best known for their parting expression: 'Crime can't crack itself'. Whenever Phil and Nige are leaving the pub, their police radios crackle a message in the phonetic alphabet sounding like a random police radio message, but it is usually a profanity or swear word spelled phonetically, 'Foxtrot Uniform Charley Kilo' being one of many examples.
 Keith Braithwaite (Eamon Boland) - Melanie's biological father. He is discussed several times in both series but does not appear until the final episode of series 2 when it is Melanie's 21st birthday party. Keith has a very brash personality and regularly uses the catch-phrase "Tick, Tock". Jean sings Angels on the karaoke after dedicating it to Ken, "who has been there all Melanie's life, not just one night". He becomes upset by this comment and tries to pick a fight with Eddie in the toilets but Ken intervenes and punches him, knocking him unconscious.

Other characters
Nicola (Sue McArdle) - Appears in 3 episodes of series 2.  She is Debbie's cousin and has a sexual encounter in the toilets with Joe in the final episode of series 2.
Bill Cooper - Winnie's Husband (Johnny Leeze). Bill appears in episode 4 of series 1; he has a minor speaking part when he wins the football card.

Series and Episodes

Series 1
Episode 1 - This episode introduces the main characters.
Episode 2 - Joe announces that his wife has left him.
Episode 3 - Melanie and Liam's relationship develops.
Episode 4 - There is a dispute over the football cards game.
Episode 5 - Joan and Eddie celebrate their wedding anniversary.
Episode 6 - Melanie meets her real father as the pub regulars enjoy their trip to York Races.

Series 2
Episode 1 - Phil and Nige sell Ken some forged banknotes.
Episode 2 - The police celebrate a drugs bust in the pub.
Episode 3 - The Grapes holds a pub quiz.
Episode 4 - There is romance between Ken and Tanya.
Episode 5 - Duffy and Joe discuss their personal lives.
Episode 6 - It's Mel's 21st birthday party.

Production
The series has no laughter track which was unusual for sitcoms at time. There is little diegetic music but the pub regulars often spontaneously sing to each other, such as "Kemptown Races" as they leave the pub for the races and "Sex Bomb" on their return. In most episodes a character will say "To the Regiment!" and others will respond "I wish I was there!".

Theme music
The theme music for the series is "Small World" by Roddy Frame from the 2002 album Surf.

The 2006 Channel 4 documentary Who Killed the British Sitcom used the closing music from Early Doors over its own end credits.

Live stage show
In June 2018, it was announced that Craig Cash and Phil Mealey had been writing Early Doors Live, a stage show based on the series. The show was due to open at The Lowry, Salford in August 2018, before a UK arena tour.

It was said that the show would bring back almost all of the original cast from the TV series, including pub landlord Ken, played by John Henshaw, 13 years on, reflecting many of the changes in the pub world - most noticeably, the smoking ban. Returning cast from the TV series included John Henshaw as Ken, Phil Mealey as Duffy, Craig Cash as Joe, Susan Cookson as Tanya, Lisa Millett as Debbie, Joan Kempson as Winnie, and James Quinn and Peter Wight as policemen Nige and Phil. Also joining the cast were Judith Barker, Vicky Binns, Nick Birkenshaw, Neil Hurst and Laura Woodward.

In January 2019, Early Doors Live won the Manchester Evening News CityLife Award for Best Theatre Production. It was soon followed by the announcement that the live stage show would be returning to The Lowry in the summer of 2019.

Reception
Despite the first series averaging just 1.7 million viewers, it was said to have "scored particularly highly on the appreciation indices". It was noted that BBC Two controller, Jane Root, decided to commission a second series in part "because such a high proportion of viewers enjoyed it." Nancy Banks-Smith, writing in The Guardian, wrote that the series was "such a slow-burning comedy that you only start to smile during the next programme." The show was placed at No. 91 in the 2003–04 Britain's Best Sitcom poll run by the BBC.

See also

References

External links

2000s British sitcoms
2003 British television series debuts
2004 British television series endings
BBC television sitcoms
Television shows set in Greater Manchester
English-language television shows
Fictional drinking establishments